
Gmina Stepnica is an urban-rural gmina (administrative district) in Goleniów County, West Pomeranian Voivodeship, in north-western Poland.

Villages
Gmina Stepnica contains the villages and settlements of Bogusławie, Borowice, Budzień, Czarnocin, Gąsierzyno, Jarszewko, Kopice, Krokorzyce, Łąka, Miłowo, Piaski Małe, Racimierz, Rogów, Stepnica, Stepniczka, Widzieńsko, Żarnówko, Żarnowo and Zielonczyn.

Neighbouring gminas
Gmina Stepnica is bordered by the city of Świnoujście and by the gminas of Goleniów, Międzyzdroje, Nowe Warpno, Police, Przybiernów and Wolin.

References
Polish official population figures 2006

Stepnica
Goleniów County